In additive number theory, Kemnitz's conjecture states that every set of lattice points in the plane has a large subset whose centroid is also a lattice point. It was proved independently in the autumn of 2003 by Christian Reiher, then an undergraduate student, and Carlos di Fiore, then a high school student.

The exact formulation of this conjecture is as follows:

Let  be a natural number and  a set of  lattice points in plane.

Kemnitz's conjecture was formulated in 1983 by Arnfried Kemnitz as a generalization of the Erdős–Ginzburg–Ziv theorem, an analogous one-dimensional result stating that every  integers have a subset of size  whose average is an integer. In 2000, Lajos Rónyai proved a weakened form of Kemnitz's conjecture for sets with  lattice points. Then, in 2003, Christian Reiher proved the full conjecture using the Chevalley–Warning theorem.

References

Further reading
 
 
Theorems in discrete mathematics
Lattice points
Combinatorics
Conjectures that have been proved